The Dana Mountains are a group of mountains just northwest of New Bedford Inlet, bounded by Mosby Glacier on the north and Haines Glacier and Meinardus Glacier on the south, in Palmer Land. They were first seen and photographed from the air by the United States Antarctic Service 1939–41. They were mapped by the United States Geological Survey from surveys and from U.S. Navy air photos, 1961–67, and were named by the Advisory Committee on Antarctic Names after James Dwight Dana, an American geologist.

Peaks
Mount Cummings

References
 

Mountain ranges of Palmer Land